Isovanillin is a phenolic aldehyde, an organic compound and isomer of vanillin.  It is a selective inhibitor of aldehyde oxidase.  It is not a substrate of that enzyme, and is metabolized by aldehyde dehydrogenase into isovanillic acid, which could make it a candidate drug  for use in alcohol aversion therapy. Isovanillin can be used as a precursor in the chemical total synthesis of morphine. The proposed metabolism of isovanillin (and vanillin) in rat has been described in literature, and is part of the WikiPathways machine readable pathway collection.

See also
 Vanillin
 2-Hydroxy-5-methoxybenzaldehyde
 ortho-Vanillin
 2-Hydroxy-4-methoxybenzaldehyde

References 

Hydroxybenzaldehydes
Flavors
Perfume ingredients
Phenol ethers